Dato is a defunct Danish  free daily newspaper published in Denmark between 2006 and 2007.

History and profile
Launched on 16 August 2006, Dato was Berlingske's offering in the "newspaper war" initiated by Dagsbrún's Nyhedsavisen. dato was, however, the first of the recent free dailies delivered to people's homes to begin publishing. The paper was owned by Det Berlingske Officin. It was distributed in Metropolitan Copenhagen and the suburbs of Århus.

The 2006 circulation of the paper was 200,000 copies in 2006. It had a circulation of 400,000 copies in March 2007.

Dato closed on 19 April 2007 and merged with another Danish free daily newspaper, Urban, also owned by Det Berlingske Officin. Det Berlingske Officin paid over 250 million DKK to publish the newspaper.

See also
 24timer
 MetroXpress
 Nyhedsavisen

References

External links
 Official website 
 Berlingske Tidende article about the launch of dato 
  News story at Det Berlingske Officin 
Gratisaviser kommer ikke ud (video)  – story from TV 2/Østjylland on the missing distribution on some editions of dato as well as 24timer (broadcast 25 August 2006)

2006 establishments in Denmark
2007 disestablishments in Denmark
Publications established in 2006
Publications disestablished in 2007
Danish-language newspapers
Defunct newspapers published in Denmark
Defunct free daily newspapers
Daily newspapers published in Denmark
Newspapers published in Copenhagen